Thennai kozhukkattai is a sweet dumpling dish, popular in the states of Tamil Nadu and Kerala in India.

Preparation
It is typically prepared on special occasions, and involves significant preparatory work, usually involving the entire family. Thennai kozhukattai is made of the same ingredients as kozhukattai, but is prepared by inserting into young coconut leaves. Unlike regular kozhukattai, the dough is not stuffed with coconut, jaggery or any other stuffing.  As preparation, young coconut leaves are cut from a tree (these are identified by the pale green colour, as opposed to the dark green of mature leaves). Their extreme tips and stems are cut off leaving the midsection of each leaf. Then, the rice dough mixture is inserted into the leaves and steamed. This dish is consumed hot from the steaming utensils.

External links
 Video of making thennai kozhukattai

Indian desserts
Indian rice dishes